Queensland is a residential neighbourhood in the southeast quadrant of Calgary, Alberta. It is bounded to the north by the community of Diamond Cove, to the east by the Bow River and Fish Creek Provincial Park, to the south by Canyon Meadows Drive, and to the west by Bow Bottom Trail.

The land was annexed to the City of Calgary in 1961 and Queensland was established in 1973. It is represented in the Calgary City Council by the Ward 14 councillor.

Demographics

Residents in this community had a median household income of $60,175 in 2000, and there were 13.2% low income residents living in the neighbourhood. As of 2000, 16.2% of the residents were immigrants. A proportion of 2.4% of the buildings were condominiums or apartments, and 15.4% of the housing was used for renting.

Education
The community is served by Haultain Memorial Elementary and Wilma Hansen Junior High School public schools.

See also
List of neighbourhoods in Calgary

References

External links
Queensland/Diamond Cove Community Association

Neighbourhoods in Calgary